It's a Man's World is a 1967 studio album by Sarah Vaughan, arranged by Hal Mooney, Bob James and Bob Freedman.

Reception

The AllMusic review by Ken Dryden stated that Vaughan's "lovely voice, which is in great form, is full of the adventurous spirit, as is the sole improviser on the date, stretching the boundaries of ten strong compositions".

Track listing
 "Alfie" (Burt Bacharach, Hal David) - 3:33
 "The Man That Got Away" (Harold Arlen, Ira Gershwin) - 4:28
 "Trouble Is a Man" (Alec Wilder) - 3:43
 "Happiness is a Thing Called Joe" (Arlen, Yip Harburg) - 3:50
 "For Every Man There's a Woman" (Arlen, Leo Robin) - 3:23
 "I Got a Man Crazy for Me" (Neil Moret, Richard Whiting) - 3:31
 "My Man (Mon Homme)" (Jacques Charles, Channing Pollack, Albert Willemetz, Maurice Yvain) - 3:52
 "I'm Just Wild About Harry" (Eubie Blake, Noble Sissle) - 2:39
 "Jim" (Caesar Petrillo, Edward Ross, Nelson Shawn) - 3:42
 "Danny Boy" (Frederic Weatherly) - 4:35

Personnel
Sarah Vaughan - vocals
Hal Mooney - Arranger
Bob James
Bob Freedman

References

Mercury Records albums
Sarah Vaughan albums
1967 albums
Albums arranged by Hal Mooney
Albums produced by Hal Mooney